Bulls and Cows (also known as Cows and Bulls or Pigs and Bulls) is a code-breaking mind or paper and pencil game for two or more players, predating the commercially marketed board game Mastermind and the hit word game Wordle.

The game is played in turns by two opponents who aim to decipher the other's secret code by trial and error.

The numerical version
The numerical version of the game is usually played with 4 digits, but can be played with any number of digits.

On a sheet of paper, the players each write a 4-digit secret number. The digits must be all different. Then, in turn, the players try to guess their opponent's number who gives the number of matches. The digits of the number guessed also must all be different. If the matching digits are in their right positions, they are "bulls", if in different positions, they are "cows". Example:
Secret number: 4271
Opponent's try: 1234
Answer: 1 bull and 2 cows. (The bull is "2", the cows are "4" and "1".)

The first player to reveal the other's secret number wins the game.

The game may also be played by two teams of players, with the team members discussing their strategy before selecting a move.

Computer versions of the game starting appearing on mainframes in the 1970s. One version called BASIC MOO was published in the DECUS Program Library for PDP computers and another was available through the DEC Users Society, both dating from 1971. In 1972, a version was written for the Multics operating system at MIT. A version written by Lane Hauck in the language FOCAL for the PDP-8 later served as the basis for the handheld game Comp IV by Milton Bradley.

These programs maintained a league table of players' scores, and protecting the integrity of this league table became a popular case study for researchers into computer security. Because the game has simple rules while still being difficult and entertaining, there are many computer variants; it is often included on cellphones and PDAs.

It is proved that any number can be solved within seven turns. The average minimal game length is  turns.

The word version
This version is usually played orally, but is easier to play if each player (or each team) keeps written notes. It is exactly like the numerical version, except instead of 4-digit numbers, 4-letter words are used. They must be real words, according to whatever language or languages you are playing the game in. Alternative versions of the game can be played with 3-letter or 5-letter words, but the 4-letter version remains the most popular one.

The game play for the word version is as follows.

One player (the Host) thinks of an isogram word (i.e. no letter appears twice) and, if the word length is not pre-determined, announces the number of letters in the word.
Other players (the Guessers) try to figure out that word by guessing isogram words containing the same number of letters.
The Host responds with the number of Cows & Bulls for each guessed word.  As with the digit version, "Cow" means a letter in the wrong position and "Bull" means a letter in the right position.

For example, if the secret word is HEAT, a guess of COIN would result in "0 Bulls, 0 Cows" (none of the guessed letters are present); a guess of EATS would result in "0 Bulls, 3 Cows" (since E, A, T are all present, but in the wrong positions from the guess), and a guess of TEAL would result in "2 Bulls, 1 Cow" (since E and A are in the right positions, while T is in the wrong position).  The game continues until one of the Guessers scores "4 Bulls" for guessing HEAT exactly.

The word version of Bulls and Cows was later adapted to Wordle, a web-based word game released in 2021 which almost immediately became a popular social media sensation. Players have six attempts to guess a five-letter word.

See also 
Jotto, a similar game with words
Lingo (American game show), a game show that contains word puzzles with similar gameplay
Sudoku
Wordle (video game), an adaptive online game, with 5 letter words
Mastermind (board game), an adaptive game using coloured pegs

References

External links
Page with the PL/1 code for Moo by J.M. Grochow
 
Bulls and Cows online solver
iOS version of Bulls & Cows
CowBull, a web version of Bulls & Cows
Koalas, a similar online game with cute animals

Games of mental skill
Guessing games
Logic puzzles
Paper-and-pencil games